Bougainvillia frondosa is a marine invertebrate, a species of hydroid in the suborder Anthomedusae. It was first described by Mayer in 1900.

References

Bougainvilliidae
Animals described in 1900